The Regius Professorship of Physic is one of the oldest  professorships at the University of Cambridge, founded by Henry VIII in 1540.  "Physic" is an old word for medicine (and the root of the word physician), not physics.

Regius Professors of Physic

References

List of Regius Professors of Physic at A Cambridge Alumni Database

 
Physic, Regius
School of Clinical Medicine, University of Cambridge
1540 establishments in England
Physic, Cambridge
Professorships in medicine